Michael John Douglas (born September 5, 1951), known professionally as Michael Keaton, is an American actor. He is known for his leading roles in a wide variety of genre films. He's received numerous accolades including a Emmy Award, and four Screen Actors Guild Awards as well as nominations for an Academy Award and a BAFTA Award. In 2016, he was named Officer of Order of Arts and Letters in France.

He gained early acclaim for his comedic roles in Night Shift (1982), Mr. Mom (1983), and Beetlejuice (1988). He continued to star in films often portraying a wide range of roles including Clean and Sober (1988), Much Ado About Nothing (1993), The Paper (1994), Multiplicity (1996), Jackie Brown (1997), Herbie: Fully Loaded (2005), and The Other Guys (2010). Keaton found a career resurgence with his role in Alejandro González Iñárritu's Birdman (2014) for which he received a Golden Globe Award for Best Actor—Motion Picture Musical or Comedy and a nomination for the Academy Award for Best Actor. He has since acted in Spotlight (2015), The Founder (2016), Worth (2020), and The Trial of the Chicago 7 (2020).

Keaton also gained stardom portraying DC Comics superhero Batman / Bruce Wayne in Batman (1989) and Batman Returns (1992) as well as the upcoming film The Flash (2023). He has also joined the Marvel Cinematic Universe portraying supervillain Vulture / Adrian Toomes in Spider-Man: Homecoming (2017) and Morbius (2022). He has also voiced roles for Porco Rosso (1992), Cars (2006), Toy Story 3 (2010), and Minions (2015).

He has also starred in television projects such as the HBO film Live from Baghdad (2002) where he played journalist Robert Wiener for which he earned a Golden Globe Award for Best Actor – Miniseries or Television Film nomination. He portrayed Dr. Samuel Finnix in Hulu limited series Dopesick (2020) for which he earned a Primetime Emmy Award for Outstanding Lead Actor in a Limited Series or Movie.

Early life
Michael John Douglas, the youngest of seven children, was born at Ohio Valley Hospital in Kennedy Township, Pennsylvania, on September 5, 1951. He was raised between McKees Rocks, Coraopolis and Robinson Township, Pennsylvania. His father, George A. Douglas (1905–1977), worked as a civil engineer and surveyor, and his mother, Leona Elizabeth (née Loftus; 1909–2002), was a homemaker, and came from McKees Rocks. Keaton was raised in a Catholic family. His mother was of Irish descent, while his father was of Scottish, Scotch-Irish, German and English ancestry, and was originally from a Protestant family. Keaton attended Montour High School in Robinson Township, Pennsylvania. He graduated with the Class of 1969, and studied Speech for two years at Kent State University, where he appeared in plays, and returned to Pennsylvania to pursue his career.

Career

1975–1982: Early work
Keaton first appeared on TV in the Pittsburgh public television programs Where the Heart Is and Mister Rogers' Neighborhood (1975). For Mister Rogers he played one of the "Flying Zookeeni Brothers" and served as a full-time production assistant. (In 2003, after Fred Rogers' death, Keaton hosted a PBS memorial tribute, Fred Rogers: America's Favorite Neighbor; in 2018, he hosted a 50th anniversary special of the series for PBS, Mister Rogers: It's You I Like.) Keaton also worked as an actor in Pittsburgh theatre; he played the role of Rick in the Pittsburgh premiere of David Rabe's Sticks and Bones with the Pittsburgh Poor Players. He also performed stand-up comedy during his early years to supplement his income.

Keaton left Pittsburgh and moved to Los Angeles to begin auditioning for various TV parts. He popped up in various popular TV shows including Maude and The Mary Tyler Moore Hour. He decided to use a stage name to satisfy SAG rules, as there were already an actor (Michael Douglas) and daytime host (Mike Douglas) with the same or similar names. In response to questions as to whether he selected his new surname due to an attraction to actress Diane Keaton, or in homage to silent film actor Buster Keaton, he has responded by saying "it had nothing to do with that." Keaton has said in several interviews that he searched a phone book under "K," saw "Keaton" and decided to stop looking. Keaton's film debut came in a small non-speaking role in the Joan Rivers film Rabbit Test.

His next big break was working alongside Jim Belushi in the short-lived comedy series Working Stiffs, which showcased his comedic talent and led to a co-starring role in the comedy Night Shift directed by Ron Howard. This was his breakout role as the fast-talking schemer Bill "Blaze" Blazejowski and earned Keaton some critical acclaim.

1983–1988: Stardom as a comic lead
Night Shift led to Keaton becoming a leading man in the 1983 comedy hit Mr. Mom. Keaton was pigeonholed as a comic lead during this time with films like Johnny Dangerously, Gung Ho, The Squeeze, and The Dream Team, though Keaton tried to transition to dramatic leads as early as 1984, playing a hockey player in Touch and Go, which was shelved until 1986. Woody Allen cast Keaton as the lead in The Purple Rose of Cairo the following year, but after filming began Allen felt Keaton was "too modern" and reshot his scenes with Jeff Daniels in the final film, further delaying his transition to drama in the public eye. When Touch and Go was finally released in 1986 the studio was still unsure of how to market the film, making the poster, trailer and TV spots similar to Mr. Mom, which resulted in the film not finding its target audience.

1988 was the seminal year in Keaton's career where he landed two major unconventional roles, forever changing his image to audiences. He played the title character in Tim Burton's horror-comedy Beetlejuice, earning Keaton widespread acclaim and boosting him to Hollywood's A list. That same year, he also gave an acclaimed dramatic performance as a drug-addicted realtor in Glenn Gordon Caron's Clean and Sober.

1989–1999: Breakthrough as a dramatic lead
Keaton's career was given another major boost when he was again cast by Tim Burton, this time as the title comic book superhero of the 1989 film Batman. Warner Bros. received thousands of letters of complaint by fans who believed Keaton was the wrong choice to portray Batman. However, Keaton's performance in the role ultimately earned widespread acclaim from both critics and audiences, and Batman became one of 1989's most successful films.

According to Les Daniels's reference book Batman: The Complete History, Keaton initially believed the film would be similar in tone to the 1960s TV series starring Adam West but he understood the darker, brooding side of Batman the film was going for after reading Frank Miller's comic book miniseries, The Dark Knight Returns, which he portrayed to much fan approval. Keaton later reprised the role for the sequel Batman Returns (1992), which was another critically acclaimed success. He was initially set to reprise the role again for a third Batman film, even going as far as to show up for costume fitting. However, when Burton was dropped as director of the film, Keaton left the franchise as well. He was reportedly dissatisfied with the screenplay approved by the new director, Joel Schumacher. According to the A&E Biography episode on Keaton, after he had refused the first time (after meetings with Schumacher), Warner Bros. offered him $15 million, but Keaton steadfastly refused and was replaced by Val Kilmer in Batman Forever (1995).

Keaton remained active during the 1990s, appearing in a wide range of films, including Pacific Heights, One Good Cop, My Life and the star-studded Shakespearean story Much Ado About Nothing. He starred in The Paper and Multiplicity, and twice in the same role, that of Elmore Leonard character Agent Ray Nicolette, in the films Jackie Brown and Out of Sight. He made the family holiday movie Jack Frost and the thriller Desperate Measures. Keaton starred as a political candidate's speechwriter in 1994's Speechless.

2000–2014: Later work

In the early 2000s, Keaton appeared in several films with mixed success, including Live From Baghdad (for which he was nominated for a Golden Globe award), First Daughter (playing the President of the United States), White Noise and Herbie: Fully Loaded. While he continued to receive good notices from the critics (particularly for Jackie Brown), he was not able to re-approach the box-office success of Batman until the release of Disney/Pixar's Cars (2006), in which he voiced Chick Hicks, a green race car with a mustache, who frequently loses his patience with losing to his longtime rival, Strip Weathers, a.k.a. The King, voiced by Richard Petty. On New Year's Day of 2004, he hosted the PBS TV special Mr. Rogers: America's Favorite Neighbor. It was released by Triumph Marketing LLC on DVD September 28, 2004. In 2006, he starred in Game 6, about the 1986 World Series bid by the Boston Red Sox. He had a cameo in the Tenacious D short film Time Fixers, an iTunes exclusive. The 9-minute film was released to coincide with Tenacious D in The Pick of Destiny. Keaton reportedly was cast as Jack Shephard in the series Lost, with the understanding that the role of Jack would be a brief one. Once the role was retooled to be a long-running series regular, Keaton withdrew. The part was then given to actor Matthew Fox. The show ran for six seasons, with the Shephard role continuing throughout.

Keaton starred in the 2007 TV miniseries The Company, set during the Cold War, in which he portrayed the real-life CIA counterintelligence chief James Jesus Angleton. The role garnered Keaton a 2008 Screen Actors Guild nomination for Outstanding Performance by a Male Actor in a Television Movie or Miniseries. Keaton provided the voice of Ken in Toy Story 3 (2010). The film received overwhelmingly positive acclaim and grossed over $1 billion worldwide, making it one of the most financially successful films ever. He announced in June 2010 his interest in returning for a Beetlejuice sequel. He played Captain Gene Mauch in the comedy The Other Guys. In 2014 he played the OmniCorp CEO Raymond Sellars in the RoboCop remake as a more active antagonist, taking RoboCop's wife and child hostage, forcing Joel Kinnaman's character to struggle to overcome the 4th directive.

2014–present: Career resurgence

Keaton starred alongside Zach Galifianakis, Edward Norton, Emma Stone, and Naomi Watts in Alejandro González Iñárritu's Birdman or (The Unexpected Virtue of Ignorance) (2014), playing Riggan Thomson, a screen actor, famous for playing the iconic titular superhero, who puts on a Broadway play based on a Raymond Carver short story to regain his former glory. He won the Golden Globe Award for Best Actor in a Musical or Comedy for his portrayal of Thomson and received an Academy Award nomination for Best Actor. In 2015, Keaton appeared as Walter V. Robinson in Tom McCarthy's Academy Award-winning film Spotlight, and in 2016, he starred as businessman Ray Kroc in the biopic The Founder. On July 28, 2016, Keaton was honored with the 2,585th star on the Hollywood Walk of Fame for his contributions to film. The star is located at 6931 Hollywood, Blvd.

In 2017, Keaton played the supervillain The Vulture in Spider-Man: Homecoming; while making this film, Keaton was unable to reprise his role as Chick Hicks for Disney/Pixar's Cars 3 and was replaced by Bob Peterson. Keaton later portrayed Stan Hurley in American Assassin. In 2019, he played the villain in Disney's live-action adaptation of Dumbo directed by Tim Burton, co-starring with Colin Farrell and Eva Green. In 2020, Keaton played U.S. Attorney General Ramsey Clark in The Trial of the Chicago 7, a legal drama directed by Aaron Sorkin about seven anti-Vietnam protesters charged with inciting riots in 1968. In 2021, Keaton starred as American lawyer Kenneth Feinberg in the Netflix biographical drama film Worth. 

In 2022, Keaton won the Screen Actors Guild Award for Outstanding Performance by a Male Actor in a Miniseries or Television Movie and Primetime Emmy Award for Outstanding Lead Actor in a Limited or Anthology Series or Movie for Hulu's Dopesick. Keaton cites his performance in 1988's Clean and Sober as an early preparation for Dopesick. He also briefly reprised his role as Vulture in the SSU film Morbius, which released on April 1, 2022.

Upcoming
It has been reported that Keaton will star in Goodrich, a film about a man whose second wife suddenly leaves him, forcing him to take sole care of their nine-year-old twins. Directed by Hallie Meyers-Shyer, filming was set to commence on October 1, 2019. In June 2020, Keaton entered talks to reprise his role as Batman/Bruce Wayne in the DC Extended Universe's upcoming superhero film, The Flash, which is scheduled to be released on June 23, 2023, after last playing the role in 1992. In August 2020, it was reported that Keaton would be reprising his role as Bruce Wayne/Batman, though Keaton disputed these claims on October 21 and again on March 22, 2021, stating that it was not confirmed. However, on April 19, 2021, Keaton's talent agency, ICM Partners, officially confirmed his involvement with the film when production had officially begun. 

He was set to reprise the character in Batgirl starring Leslie Grace, set for a release on HBO Max, taking some inspiration from the acclaimed DC Animated Universe animated series, Batman Beyond, with Keaton playing the elder Bruce Wayne as the title character's mentor and remote coordinator in the Batcave. The film was cancelled in August 2022. He will also reprise the character in the 2023 scheduled Aquaman and the Lost Kingdom, in a deleted scene. On May 6, 2022, it was reported that Keaton is set to star in and direct the noir thriller, Knox Goes Away.

Personal life
Keaton was married to Caroline McWilliams from 1982–90. They have a son, Sean, born in 1983. Keaton had a relationship with actress Courteney Cox from 1990–95. 

Keaton, a longtime Pittsburgh resident and fan of its sports teams, negotiated a break in his Batman movie contract in case the Pittsburgh Pirates made the playoffs that year, although they ultimately did not. He also wrote an ESPN blog on the Pirates during the final months of their 2013 season.

In the 1980s, Keaton bought a ranch near Big Timber, Montana, where he spends much of his time. An avid fisherman, he is often seen on the saltwater fishing series Buccaneers & Bones on Outdoor Channel, along with Tom Brokaw, Zach Gilford, Thomas McGuane and Yvon Chouinard, among others.

Politics 
Keaton supported Barack Obama in 2008, Hillary Clinton for President in the 2016 U.S. presidential election, and Joe Biden in the 2020 U.S. presidential election. Despite his political outspokenness during the 2020 election, Keaton later stated that it's better for celebrities not to speak about politics. 

In 2019, he appeared in a PETA ad campaign, asking tourists not to visit operations that exploit animals, such as roadside zoos which sometimes offer the opportunity to get selfies with wild animals.

Filmography

Film

Television

Video games

Honorary degrees
 Honorary Doctor of Humane Letters from Kent State University in 2018
 Honorary Doctor of Fine Arts degree from Carnegie Mellon University in 2017

Awards and nominations

Keaton was honored with a Career Achievement Award from the Hollywood Film Festival. He is also a visiting scholar at Carnegie Mellon University.

References

External links

 
 

1951 births
Living people
20th-century American male actors
21st-century American male actors
American male film actors
American male television actors
American male video game actors
American male voice actors
American people of English descent
American people of German descent
American people of Irish descent
American people of Scotch-Irish descent
American people of Scottish descent
Best Actor AACTA International Award winners
Best Miniseries or Television Movie Actor Golden Globe winners
Best Musical or Comedy Actor Golden Globe (film) winners
Independent Spirit Award for Best Male Lead winners
Kent State University alumni
Male actors from Pittsburgh
Officiers of the Ordre des Arts et des Lettres
Outstanding Performance by a Cast in a Motion Picture Screen Actors Guild Award winners
Outstanding Performance by a Lead Actor in a Miniseries or Movie Primetime Emmy Award winners
People from Coraopolis, Pennsylvania
People from Sweet Grass County, Montana
Pennsylvania Democrats